Aitor Iturrioz (born Aitor Antonio Iturrioz Ortiz on April 9, 1970) is a Mexican actor. He is best known for his roles in the Mexican telenovela Clase 406 as Max Brouer, in Rebelde as Esteban Nolasco, and in Al diablo con los guapos as the antagonist Mateo.

Aitor Iturrioz is of Basque descent.

Career
Aitor Iturrioz began his television career as the program presenter for Don Francisco Presenta. Later on he acted in several television soap operas such as Retrato de Familia (1995) and Luz Clarita (1996).

In 2004, he was cast in the first season of the telenovela Rebelde, playing the role of Esteban Nolasco, but was replaced the next year by Tony Dalton. In 2006, he appeared in the series La fea más bella, a remake of the Colombian telenovela Yo soy Betty, la fea. The following year he starred in the production Lola: Once Upon a Time.

Filmography

External links
Aitor Iturrioz  at the Internet Movie Database

1970 births
Living people
Mexican male telenovela actors
Mexican people of Basque descent
Male actors from Mexico City